The muezzin is the person who proclaims the call to the daily prayer (ṣalāt) five times a day (Fajr prayer, Zuhr prayer, Asr prayer, Maghrib prayer and Isha prayer) at a mosque. The muezzin plays an important role in ensuring an accurate prayer schedule for the Muslim community.

Etymology 
The word means "one by the ear", since the word stems from the word for "ear" in Arabic is ʾudhun (أُذُن). As the muʾadh·dhin will place both hands on his ears to recite the call to prayer.

Roles and responsibilities

The professional muezzin is chosen for his good character, voice and skills to serve at the mosque. However, the muezzin is not considered a cleric, but in a position comparable to a Christian verger. He is responsible for keeping the mosque clean, for rolling the carpets, for cleaning the toilets and the place where people wash their hands, face and feet when they perform the Wuḍu' (Arabic: wuḍū’ وُضُوء, the "purification" of ablution) before offering the prayer. When calling to prayer, the muezzin faces the qiblah, the direction of the Ka'bah in Makkah, while reciting the adhan.

From the fourteenth history, initially in Mamluk Egypt but then spread into other parts of the Islamic world, major mosques might employ a related officer, the muwaqqit, who determined the prayer times using mathematical astronomy.  Unlike the muezzin who were typically chosen for their piety and beautiful voice, the qualification of the muwaqqit required special knowledge in astronomy. Historian Sonja Brentjes speculates that the muwaqqit might have evolved from a specialised muezzin, and that there might not have been a clear delineation between the two offices. Some celebrated muwaqqits, including Shams al-Din al-Khalili and ibn al-Shatir, were known to have once been muezzins, and many individuals held both offices simultaneously. Today, with the production of electronic devices and authoritative timetables, a muezzin in a mosque can broadcast the call to prayer by consulting a table or a clock without requiring the specialised skill of a muwaqqit.

Call of the muezzin
The call of the muezzin is considered an art form, reflected in the melodious chanting of the adhan. In Turkey there is an annual competition to find the country's best muezzin.

Historically, a muezzin would have recited the call to prayer atop the minarets in order to be heard by those around the mosque. Now, mosques often have loudspeakers mounted on the top of the minaret and the muezzin will use a microphone, or a recording is played, allowing the call to prayer to be heard at great distances without climbing the minaret.

Origins
The institution of the muezzin has existed since the time of Muhammad. The first muezzin was a former slave Bilal ibn Rabah, one of the most trusted and loyal sahabah (companions) of the Islamic prophet Muhammad. He was born in Mecca and is considered to have been the first mu'azzin, chosen by Muhammad himself.

Although many of the customs associated with the muezzin remained undecided at the time of Muhammad's death, including which direction one should choose for the calling, where it should be performed, and the use of trumpets, flags or lamps, all of these are elements of the muezzin's role during the adhan.

After minarets became customary at mosques, the office of muezzin in cities was sometimes given to a blind man, who could not see down into the inner courtyards of the citizens' houses and thus could not violate privacy.

Notable muezzins
  Bilal ibn Ribah al-Habashi
 Rahim Moazzen Zadeh Ardabili
 Ali Ahmed Mulla

See also
 Salah, Muslim daily prayer
 Adhan, the Islamic call to prayer, recited by the muezzin
 Schulklopfer, the Jewish equivalent of the muezzin
 Loudspeakers in mosques

References

Bibliography

Further reading

Online
 Muezzin Islamic religious official, in Encyclopædia Britannica Online, by The Editors of Encyclopaedia Britannica, Gloria Lotha, Deepti Mahajan and Amy Tikkanen

External links

"Cairo to use computerised call to prayer after complaints over tuneless muezzin", 13 Aug 2010
"Muslim preachers given call-to-prayer singing lessons", 11 May 2010

 
Mosques
Islamic terminology